Hogots monastery was an Armenian monastery in the western Gürpınar district of modern Turkey. It was situated 5 kilometers northwest of Özlüce village in the district.

Etymology
Hogots monastery  is Armenian for Monastery of the Holy Spirit.

History
Hogots monastery was one of the few notable monasteries of Historical Armenia's Antzevasiq district, which was a part of larger province of Vaspurakan. Similar to Surb Bardughmeosi vank, Hogots monastery was a pilgrimage site for Armenians from the Van region. In the seventeenth century, it became the main religious building of the Norduz district of the Vilayet of Van in the Ottoman Empire. The priest Vahan was the last of the known priests of the monastery preceding the Armenian genocide during 1915. It is believed that almost a hundred Armenian women and children in the monastery were burned to death when they tried to lock themselves inside during the genocide.

Current condition 
According to unconfirmed sources, the Hogots monastery was used as a target during Turkish military training exercises in late 1946 and suffered extensive damage.

References

Armenian churches in Turkey
Christian monasteries established in the 6th century
Armenian buildings in Turkey